Amis House is a pioneer settlement in Hawkins County, Tennessee near Rogersville, built in 1780–2 by Thomas Amis, the father-in-law of Rogersville founder Joseph Rogers.

In addition to his stone house, which also served as an inn for travelers, Amis established a tavern, general store, distillery, saw mill, and grist mill. The property was surrounded by a palisade for protection from possible attack by Native Americans. 

The Amis House property was listed on the National Register of Historic Places in 1973. Ownership of Amis House has remained in the Amis family. Current owners are Jake and Wendy Jacobs; Wendy is a descendant of Thomas Amis. Tours of the home and grounds are offered.

See also
List of the oldest buildings in Tennessee

References

External links
 Thomas Amis House

Further reading
 Goodspeed, History of East Tennessee. (Knoxville: 1887).
 Price, Henry, Old Rogersville: An Illustrated History of Rogersville, Tennessee.  Vol. I.  (Rogersville: 2001).
 Price, Henry, Hawkins County: A Pictorial History.  (Rogersville: 1996).

Rogersville, Tennessee
Buildings and structures in Hawkins County, Tennessee
Protected areas of Hawkins County, Tennessee
National Register of Historic Places in Hawkins County, Tennessee
Houses completed in 1782
1782 establishments in North Carolina